Middle-earth Role Playing Combat Screen is a 1984 fantasy role-playing game supplement published by Iron Crown Enterprises for Middle-earth Role Playing.

Contents
Middle-earth Role Playing Combat Screen is a gamemaster's screen, which provides a comprehensive quick reference guide.

Publication history
Middle-earth Role Playing Combat Screen was written by Chris White, and was published by Iron Crown Enterprises in 1984 as two cardstock screens, and two 11" x 17" sheets.

Reception
Andy Blakeman reviewed Middle-earth Role Playing Combat Screen for Imagine magazine, and stated that "one could easily photocopy the tables straight from the rulebook - no new material is presented - for far less than the selling price of the Screen; and ICE could have granted permission for players to do so. As it is, they are selling people something they already have at a price they can hardly afford."

References

Gamemaster's screens
Middle-earth Role Playing supplements
Role-playing game supplements introduced in 1984